Rudolph (Rudolf) Pokorny (1880 in Tišnov, Moravia – ?) was an Austro-Mexican chess player.

Born in Tischnowitz (now Tišnov), he moved to America (Mexico and the United States). He was a manager of the hair-dressing parlors of Rudolph Pokorny & Co.

He took 6th at New York 1920 (Oscar Chajes won), and took 11th at New York 1920 (Dawid Janowski and R.T. Black won).

References

1880 births
Year of death missing
People from Tišnov
Mexican people of Austrian descent
Czech chess players
Austrian chess players
Mexican chess players
Austro-Hungarian emigrants to Mexico